Harter is a surname. Notable people with the surname include:

Ali Harter (born 1984), American singer-songwriter
Andy Harter (born 1961), English computer scientist
Carol Harter (born 1941), American university president
Dick Harter (1930–2012), American basketball player and coach
Dow W. Harter (1885–1971), American politician
Frank Harter (1886–1959), American baseball player
George Loyd Foster Harter (1852–1920), British barrister and High Sheriff of Gloucestershire
J. Francis Harter (1897–1947), American politician
J. Michael Harter (born 1979), American singer-songwriter
Michael D. Harter (1846–1896), American politician
Rachel M. Harter, American statistician
Roy Harter (born 1973), American composer and musician